Embera or Emberá may refer to:
 Emberá people, an ethnic group of Colombia and Panama
 Embera language, a group of languages of Colombia and Panama
 Comarca Emberá, a territory of Panama

See also 
 AeroAndina MXP-158 Embera, an aircraft
 Hyundai Sonata Embera, a car
 Embra

Language and nationality disambiguation pages